Kenny Klein (1955-2020) was an American folk and country musician and a published author. He was an elder and high priest in the Blue Star tradition of Wicca. Klein was a fiddler, playing styles ranging from British folk to jazz and swing. He was convicted in April 2017 of 20 counts of possession of child pornography. He died while serving his sentence in prison.

Musical career
Born in New York City, Klein and his then-wife performed as a duo called Kenny and Tzipora in the mid-1980s, and they recorded several projects on Kicking Mule Records, including the album Wineskins, Tinkers, & Tears in 1985. Together with their children they traveled around the US, performing at pagan festivals, Renaissance fairs, and folk music venues. In 1992, Kenny and Tzipora divorced, and Kenny began his solo music career, subsequently releasing several projects on Blackthorn Records. In 1998 he released the CD Muses, an album of all original music produced by Brewers' Witch Productions.

Neopagan activities
Through his interest in British folk music, Klein discovered the Wiccan and Neopagan communities. While living in New York City, he joined Tzipora Katz's Blue Star coven and tradition of Wicca; he married Katz, who initiated him as a high priest in that tradition in 1983. From 1983 to 1992 Katz and Klein were largely responsible for transforming Blue Star from a local coven to a Wiccan tradition of its own. Touring the country during that period performing music, Kenny and Tzipora continued to teach Blue Star Wicca, initiating people and founding covens, as well as teaching via recording and distributing lessons on cassette tapes.

In 1993, Klein authored The Flowering Rod: Men, Sex and Spirituality, a book on Wicca and men's mysteries.

Child pornography conviction
On March 25, 2014, agents of the Louisiana State Police Special Victims Unit executed a search warrant at Klein's residence and seized a computer that contained 20 videos showing minor children engaged in sexually explicit activities. On April 6, 2017, after a three-day jury trial, Klein was convicted of one count of pornography involving a juvenile under age 13, and 19 counts of possession with intent to distribute pornography involving juveniles under age 17. He was sentenced to twenty years in prison, fined $2,500 and ordered that, upon release, he wear an electronic ankle monitor for the rest of his life.
During the course of his trial, testimony from both of his children revealed years of sexual abuse while they were young, verifying his actions as a criminal pedophile. It also revealed his physical abuse of his ex-wife. The court testimony is public record.

Death
On 13 July 2020 it was reported on the Wild Hunt and in various places on social media that on Saturday, 11 July 2020, Klein died in prison of pancreatic cancer, in the B.B. “Sixty” Rayburn Correctional Facility in Washington Parish near Angie, Louisiana.

Written works
Fairy Tale Rituals (May 2011), Llewellyn Worldwide 
 Through The Faerie Glass (February 2010), Llewellyn Worldwide  
 The Flowering Rod: Men, Sex and Spirituality (March 1993), Delphi Press , 
 Lilith, Queen of the Desert (July 2010), includes the poem "Lilith" by Kenny Klein, Knickerbocker Circus Publishing, 
 Girls I Knew When I Was Twenty (August 2004), Poetic Diversity.
 Legba in the French Market

Discography

Solo
 1994: Gold of the Autumn – Blackthorn Records
 1995: High Grows the Barley – Blackthorn Records
 1998: Muses – Brewers' Witch Productions
 2004: The Fairy Queen – Blackthorn Records
 2005: Little Birds Of Desire – Blackthorn Records
 2005: Barley Moon – Blackthorn Records
 2007: Meet Me in the Shade of the Maple Tree – Blackthorn Records
 2008: Oak & Ash – Blackthorn Records
 2011: Ghosts of the Delta – Independent
 2012: Black Cat Blues – Independent

With Tzipora Katz
 1983: Worn Out Threads and Tire Treads (live album) – Kicking Mule Records 
 1983: Moon Hooves in the Sand – Blue Star Records (cassette)
 1984: Songs of the Otherworld – Kenny & Tzipora (cassette)
 1985: Wineskins, Tinkers, & Tears – Kicking Mule Records (LP)
 1986: Dreamer's Web – Kenny & Tzipora (cassette)
 1988: Fairy Queen – Kenny & Tzipora (cassette)
 1989: Both Sides of the Water – Kenny & Tzipora (cassette)
 1990: Branches – Kenny & Tzipora — Magical Audio Graphics Incomplete (cassette)
 1990: Kenny & Tzipora: Live & Kickin' at A.C.E. – A.C.E. (cassette)
 1990: Enchantress – Gypsy (Kenny & Tzipora guest artists) – White Light Pentacles (cassette; CD release 2001)
 2004: Best of Pagan Song (compilation CD) – Serpentine Music Productions

References

1955 births
2020 deaths
21st-century American male musicians
21st-century American violinists
American bluegrass musicians
American fiddlers
American folk musicians
American jazz violinists
American male violinists
American members of the clergy convicted of crimes
American occultists
American people convicted of child pornography offenses
American people who died in prison custody
American Wiccans
American male jazz musicians
Renaissance fair performers
Wiccan priests
Prisoners who died in Louisiana detention
Deaths from pancreatic cancer
Deaths from cancer in Louisiana